"I Am Love" is a song by singer Jennifer Holliday, released as a single in 1983 by Geffen Records from her album Feel My Soul. 
The song reached No. 2 on the Billboard Hot R&B Singles chart.

Overview
"I Am Love" was produced by Maurice White and written by White, David Foster and Allee Willis. The B-side of the single is a song called "Heartstrings".

Critical reception
Stephen Holden of The New York Times called "I Am Love" a "big, bursting ballad..that deliberately recall(s) her Dreamgirls arias" and a "big, swelling tune and lyrics that make a grand pronouncement".
Johnny Loftus of Allmusic proclaimed that "I Am Love" is the real standout. Beginning as a fluttering, austere piano ballad, the song abruptly shifts into high gear, where Holliday's high note trills and enormous chorus vocalizing recall her mind-blowing performance of "And I Am Telling You I'm Not Going" from Dreamgirls."

References

1983 songs
1983 singles
Geffen Records singles
Songs written by David Foster
Songs written by Allee Willis
Songs written by Maurice White
Song recordings produced by Maurice White